Paul Taylor (born 11 October 1986 in Chelmsford) is a British-Irish comedian. He moved to Paris in 2009 and started doing stand-up in 2013. Paul Taylor is known in France for his TV series on Canal+, What the Fuck France, What's Up France? and Stereotrip, but he got his onstage debut with his show #Franglais (2016-2019). Paul Taylor played his second show, So British (ou presque), from 2019 to June 2022. His third show, Bisoubye x, is scheduled for January 2023.

Biography 
Paul Taylor was born in Chelmsford, England. His father is English and his mother is Irish but Paul grew up in Switzerland (from 2 to 4 years old) and in France until he was 9 years old. Because of his upbringing, he speaks French with no discernible foreign accent. Paul then moved back to England after his parents separated.

Paul Taylor studied languages at university in London – he can speak English, French and Spanish fluently. After his studies, he got a job at Apple. Three years after being hired, he became a trainer for Apple employees abroad. He moved to Paris when he was 23, and decided then to "get up on stage and make people laugh." As he recalled in his show #Franglais, he quit Apple without any unemployment benefits, which is quite unusual in France.

Media debut 
While at university, Taylor was an extra in The Oxford Murders. What made him known to a larger audience was the online video La Bise (referring to the cheek kisses used as a greeting in France). The video, which was made to promote a night of English language humor in Paris, was uploaded on 1 January 2016, and has now more than 3 million views. Filmed in a sequence shot, La Bise mocked this French tradition, and served as a model for Taylor's show What the Fuck France? episodes.

Television 
Thanks to the success of La Bise, watched over a million times in a few days on YouTube, Canal+ contacted Paul Taylor the week following its release, offering him to develop a regular short program along the same format. What the Fuck France? was then broadcast on Canal+. The three-minute short comedy show debuted in September 2016, and ran for 34 episodes in which Taylor humorously dissects the peculiarities of French life, as seen through an expat's eyes. What the Fuck France? was one of the first shows broadcast in English on a French network.

A second program, also broadcast on Canal+, was released in 2017 in a similar format: What's Up France? This time, Taylor dissected and analysed the French news in 14 episodes.

Finally, a third show was created in 2018 with Canal+. Stereotrip (a contraction of stereotype and roadtrip) reviews the clichés and stereotypes associated with Italy, Switzerland, Spain, Sweden, Germany, and England in six 45-minute episodes.

Stand-up shows 
Taylor defines himself primarily as a stand-up comedian. After a few attempts in England at amateur stand-up, he made his debut in Paris in 2013. He became successful quite quickly, particularly thanks to his online videos and his projects with Canal+.

#Franglais 
His first stand-up show, #Franglais, 50% in French, 50% en anglais, was performed in different Parisian theatres such as Le Sentier des Halles, La Nouvelle Eve, and L'Européen, and then on tour in France, Europe and Canada, for almost three years. The entire show was filmed at La Nouvelle Eve in March 2018, and broadcast on Canal+. The final three shows took place at the Casino de Paris in front of 1,400 spectators.

In #Franglais, Paul Taylor talked about his woes with the French language, which he hasn't mastered yet, even after many years of studying and despite his flawless accent.

So British (ou presque) 
On 18 October 2019, Taylor debuted his second show, So British (ou presque), after a break-in period of a few weeks in August 2018 at the Point Virgule. The new show was almost called Rebecoming British, but the title was rejected as the verb to rebecome was a neologism coined by Taylor.

On 22 June 2020 he participated in a special show at L'Européen, Retour vers la Culture, to celebrate the end of the Coronavirus lockdown and a return to normalcy in France. A dozen artists performed that night, such as Bun Hay Mean and Fills Monkey.

Bisoubye x 
Paul Taylor's work in progress for his first show started on 3 November 2022 at la Scala, in Paris. The new show is scheduled to start on 4 January 2023 at La Cigale in Paris.

Bisoubye x unveils the people and things Paul Taylor has had to say goodbye to in order to make way for a new chapter in his life.

Live at Five and Happy Hour  

On 20 April 2020, Taylor debuted a new show on YouTube to entertain his fans during the Coronavirus lockdown: Live at Five. It originally streamed from Taylor's kitchen table at 5 PM CEST, but was eventually moved to 7 PM CEST, and then 6 PM CEST to accommodate Taylor's home life. During the show, Taylor would chat directly with fans, using FaceTime and Skype to videocall his family (primarily his mother, though both his brother and father also appeared on the show), co-workers such as his director Felix, and particularly long-time friend and fellow comedian, Quebecois Rolly Assal. 

The episodes lasted approximately an hour. Taylor decided to rename his live broadcasts Paul Taylor's Happy Hour, as he'd often drink a beer while filming and chatting. The show was primarily in English, though there were several special episodes, dubbed "Frandredi" (from français and vendredi, "French Friday") on Fridays, when the show was almost entirely in French. Some later episodes also included Taylor interacting with fans via Zoom. 

Taylor streamed 70 episodes, until 7 July 2020, before taking a break for the French summer holidays.

Most episodes after 10 May have been turned into podcasts, and are available for free on Taylor's website, with additional material at the beginning and end of each podcast.

Several episodes have also been held with a live audience in Paris at the Barbes Comedy Club

Inspiration 
Comedians Lee Evans, Ricky Gervais and Louis C.K are credited as influences of Taylor.

Personal life 
Taylor married his wife Adeline on 3 June 2017. Their daughter, Louise, was born in France on  June 28, 2019.

Taylor has a half-brother, Kyle Taylor, who plays professional football as a midfielder for Exeter City in the English Football League.

Taylor is left-handed, and plays the guitar.

References

External links 
 

Irish male comedians
British male comedians
French comedians
1986 births
People from London
Living people
Irish stand-up comedians
British stand-up comedians
21st-century Irish comedians
21st-century British comedians